Barbara Charlotte Rodbell-Ledermann (née Ledermann; born 4 September 1925) is a German Holocaust survivor. She was the sister of Sanne Ledermann and a good friend of Margot Frank.

Early life 
Barbara Ledermann was born in Berlin in 1925, the first daughter of business lawyer and notary  (1889–1943) and Dutch pianist  (1904–1943). Her sister Sanne (1928–1943) was three years her junior. Her entire family was murdered at Auschwitz concentration camp.

She emigrated to the United States and married the biochemist Martin Rodbell. They had four children. Barbara Rodbell-Ledermann was widowed in 1998, and still resides in North Carolina.

References 

Living people
1925 births
German people of Dutch descent
German emigrants to the United States
Anne Frank
Holocaust survivors
20th-century German women
People from Berlin
People from Amsterdam
American people of German descent